(born December 3, 1968, in Inazawa, Aichi Prefecture) is a Japanese novelist. His first novel, the psycho-thriller Saimin (Hypnosis) sold over a million copies on its release in 1997 and has been adapted into a film of the same name by Masayuki Ochiai. His sophomore release of Senrigan (Clairovoyance) about a Air Self-Defense Force fighter pilot turned clinical psychologist launched a popular series, which have achieved combined sales of over six and a quarter million books. He is author of the nine-volume Banno kanteishi Q no jikenbo (Casebook of Universal Appraiser Q) series, and the Tantei no tantei (Detective vs Detectives) series, also adapted into a television series of the same name by Fuji TV. 

Matsuoka is best known outside of Japan for his Sherlock Holmes pastiche, A Scandal in Japan, which has been translated into English by James Balzer. The novel explores the time between Holmes' alleged death at Reichenbach Falls and his reappearance in London three years later. 

Goodreads notes, "He is known for deftly weaving global political issues and near-future projections into his works".

Novels
Saimin (Hypnosis) (1997) - Kadokawa
Senrigan (jp:千里眼シリーズ) (Clairovoyance) (1999) - Kadokawa
Magician (2002) - Kadokawa
The Melancholy of Mickey Mouse (2005) - Shinchosha 
Aoi Hitomi and Nuage (2007) - Kadokawa
Banno kanteishi Q no jikenbo (jp:Qシリーズ) (Casebook of Universal Appraiser Q) (2010) - Kadokawa
Tantei no tantei (jp:探偵の探偵) (Detective vs Detectives) (2014) - Kodansha 
Mizukagami suiri (Water Mirror Detective) (2015) - Kodansha
Shaarokku Homuzu tai Ito Hirobumi (Sherlock Holmes: A Scandal in Japan) (2017) - Kodansha
Songbun (jp:出身成分) (Origin) (2019) - Kadokawa

Film and television
Saimin (1999) - Toho
Senrigan (2000) - Toei
All-Round Appraiser Q: The Eyes of Mona Lisa (2013) - Toho
Detective versus Detectives (2015) - Fuji TV

References

External links
 
 Keisuke Matsuoka on Goodreads

1968 births
Living people
Japanese crime fiction writers
20th-century Japanese novelists
21st-century Japanese novelists
Japanese detective fiction writers
Writers of historical fiction set in the modern age
People from Inazawa